USS Tarantula (SP-124) was a patrol boat in the United States Navy. She was named after the tarantula.

East Coast Assignment
Tarantula was built as a motor yacht in 1912 at Neponset, Massachusetts, by George Lawley and Son Corp. She was acquired by the U.S. Navy on 25 April 1917 from W. K. Vanderbilt of New York City. Assigned to section patrol in the 3rd Naval District during World War I, Tarantula operated along the coastal waters of Connecticut, New York, and New Jersey until October 1918.

Collision and sinking
Her name was subsequently struck from the Naval Vessel Register.

Tarantula′s owner subsequently was paid $75,000 to cover her value.

References

External links

Tarantula (American Motor Yacht, 1912). Served as USS Tarantula (SP-124) in 1917-1918

Patrol vessels of the United States Navy
Ships built in Boston
Shipwrecks of the New Jersey coast
World War I shipwrecks in the Atlantic Ocean
World War I patrol vessels of the United States
1912 ships
Maritime incidents in 1918
Ships sunk in collisions
Former yachts of New York City